Lermontovo refers to the Russian poet Mikhail Lermontov.

Places named Lermontovo include:
Tarkhany estate in Lermontovo, Penza Oblast, Russia
Lermontovo Microdistrict, part of Kaliningrad Oblast, Russia
Lermontovo, Armenia

See also 
 Lermontov (disambiguation)
 Lermontova (disambiguation)